Ufa con el sexo is a 1968 Argentine comedy film directed by Rodolfo Kuhn.

Cast

Censorship
Although Ufa con el sexo does not include any nudity or sex scenes, Argentina banned the film, which includes themes of love and prostitution, for violating morality standards. It was not shown in the country until 2007.

References

External links
 

1968 films
Argentine comedy films
1960s Spanish-language films
Films directed by Rodolfo Kuhn
1960s Argentine films